The 10th Michigan Infantry Regiment was an infantry regiment that served in the Union Army between February 10, 1862, and August 1, 1865, during the American Civil War.

Service 
The 10th Michigan Infantry was organized at  Flint, Michigan, and  mustered into Federal service for a three-year enlistment on February 10, 1862.

Tenth Michigan Infantry. — Col., Charles M. Lum; Lieut. -Cols., Christopher J. Dickerson, William H. Dunphy; Majs., James J. Scarrett, Henry S. Burnett, Sylvan Ter Bush. This regiment was organized at Flint during the fall and winter of 1861-62 and was mustered in, Feb. 6, 1862. It left the state April 22, being ordered to Corinth, and was first in action at Farmington. It participated in the siege of Corinth; was engaged at Boonville in June; was then ordered to Nashville and assigned to the 1st brigade, and division, Rosecrans' army. It was engaged in provost, guard and fatigue duty at Nashville, Murfreesboro and on Stone's river during the year. On Jan. 3, 1863, Cos. A and D were attacked by a large force of guerrillas, but repulsed them, killing 15 and capturing as many more. On the 25th a squad guarding a train was captured by 200 of the enemy's cavalry. Twenty-seven men of the 10th being near, went forward and routed the enemy with heavy loss, capturing guns and horses and saving most of the train, which had been fired. On April 10 several hundred guerrillas drove a detail of 46 men away from the train they were guarding, but reinforced by 15 men, the guard returned and saved the train. In August and September the regiment joined in the march from Murfreesboro to Columbia, Stevenson, and Bridgeport, Ala., then moved to Anderson's cross-roads, thence to Smith's ferry, which place was reached Oct. 26. On Nov. 26 it participated in the capture of Chickamauga Station, and then moving towards Knoxville marched for several days, but was ordered to Columbus, reaching there Dec. 9. It moved for Chattanooga on the 15th and 395 having reenlisted as veterans on Feb. 6, 1864, they were expecting to receive the longed-for furlough, but instead on the 23d, the regiment was ordered to prepare for a movement into Georgia. The order was cheerfully obeyed and the regiment participated in the battle of Buzzard Roost, losing 13 killed, 36 wounded and 17 missing. It made a gallant advance over two sharp ridges, but being unsupported was compelled to return to its earlier stand. The 10th then took part in the successful counter attack at Tunnel Hill before being furloughed home in March and on its return reached Chattanooga May 11, in time to take part in the Atlanta campaign. It was engaged at Resaca, Rome and Dallas, was in reserve at Kennesaw mountain. When Confederate General John Bell Hood attacked in defense of Atlanta the 10th fought valiantly at Peach Tree Creek, as well as engagements at Sandtown, Red Oak, Rough and Ready, and at Jonesboro charged the enemy's works, taking 400 prisoners and a stand of colors, losing 30 killed and 47 wounded. It went into camp at Atlanta on Sept. 8, and on the 28th moved to Stevenson, Huntsville, Athens and Florence, skirmishing at the latter place. It proceeded to Chattanooga, thence to Rome, Ga., and moved forward with the army on the Savannah campaign, engaging in skirmishes at Sandersville and Louisville, four companies defeating a superior force at the latter place. The regiment reached Savannah Dec. 11 and moved into the city on the 21st. It then participated in the campaign of the Carolinas, being engaged with the enemy at Fayetteville, Averasboro, Southfield road and Bentonville. It reached Richmond May 7, was in the grand review at Washington, moved to Louisville, Ky., in June, and was mustered out on July 19. Its original strength was 997: gain by recruits, 791; total, 1,788. Loss by death, 299.

The regiment was mustered out on August 1, 1865. The Tenth Michigan Infantry as it exists today is a Civil War Reenactment group dedicated to reliving history by first person impressions and educating on the history of the American Civil War through portrayals in schools, in parades and at local events throughout Michigan and the United States.

Total strength and casualties 
The regiment suffered 7 officers and 95 enlisted men who were killed in action or mortally wounded and 2 officers and 223 enlisted men who died of disease, for a total of 327 
fatalities.

References

Bibliography 
 Dyer, Frederick H. (1959). A Compendium of the War of the Rebellion. New York and London. Thomas Yoseloff, Publisher. .
 Pierce, Byron Root. (2003). Civil War Regiments from Michigan. eBookOnDisk.com Pensacola, Florida. .

Units and formations of the Union Army from Michigan
1865 disestablishments in Michigan
1862 establishments in Michigan
Military units and formations established in 1862
Military units and formations disestablished in 1865